Christian Wellisch (born September 13, 1975) is a Hungarian-American former professional mixed martial artist. A professional competitor from 2001 until 2009, he competed for the UFC, WEC, and King of the Cage.

Mixed martial arts career
Wellisch began his professional career in 2001 as a Heavyweight fighting in smaller promotions. In 2006, he scored a stoppage victory over the undefeated Dan Evensen. With a record of 6–2, Wellisch made his Ultimate Fighting Championship (UFC) debut against Cheick Kongo at UFC 62. He lost by knockout due to a knee strike in the first round. Wellisch followed up with two victories against Anthony Perosh and Scott Junk at UFC 66 and UFC 76 respectively. His streak ended at UFC 84, where undefeated rising star Shane Carwin knocked him out with a punch in 44 seconds of the first round, knocking his mouthguard out as well.

In November 2008, the UFC released Wellisch from his contract along with Jon Fitch and other American Kickboxing Academy (AKA) fighters as a result of a dispute over the exclusive license rights for a video game between AKA and UFC President Dana White. The dispute was resolved a day later and Wellisch, along with the other AKA fighters, were re-signed.

In his next appearance, Wellisch made his Light Heavyweight debut at UFC 94, where he lost to Jake O'Brien by split decision. With his second consecutive loss, and the UFC facing a glut of fighters due to recent acquisitions of WEC contracts, Wellisch was released from the UFC roster.

Life after MMA
Having graduated from the McGeorge School of Law, Wellisch decided to retire from MMA and now runs his own law practice outside San Jose, California. Speaking on his decision to retire, Wellisch said "I told myself when I got into this sport that I wasn't going to take any steps backwards", he also said "I'm not going to go fight in the small shows, I think I made the right decision".

He enlisted in the California Army National Guard and currently holds the rank of Captain.

Mixed martial arts record

|-
| Loss
| align=center| 8–5
| Jake O'Brien
| Decision (split)
| UFC 94
| 
| align=center| 3
| align=center| 5:00
| Las Vegas, Nevada, United States
| Light Heavyweight debut.
|-
| Loss
| align=center| 8–4
| Shane Carwin
| KO (punch)
| UFC 84
| 
| align=center| 1
| align=center| 0:44
| Las Vegas, Nevada, United States
| 
|-
| Win
| align=center| 8–3
| Scott Junk
| Submission (heel hook)
| UFC 76
| 
| align=center| 1
| align=center| 3:19
| Anaheim, California, United States
| 
|-
| Win
| align=center| 7–3
| Anthony Perosh
| Decision (unanimous)
| UFC 66: Liddell vs. Ortiz
| 
| align=center| 3
| align=center| 5:00
| Las Vegas, Nevada, United States
| 
|-
| Loss
| align=center| 6–3
| Cheick Kongo
| KO (knee)
| UFC 62: Liddell vs. Sobral
| 
| align=center| 1
| align=center| 2:51
| Las Vegas, Nevada, United States
| 
|-
| Win
| align=center| 6–2
| Dan Evensen
| TKO (corner stoppage)
| IFC: Caged Combat
| 
| align=center| 2
| align=center| 5:00
| Sacramento, California, United States
| 
|-
| Win
| align=center| 5–2
| Tom Howard
| Submission (rear-naked choke)
| Valor Fighting: Showdown At Cache Creek
| 
| align=center| 1
| align=center| 2:11
| Brooks, California, United States
| 
|-
| Loss
| align=center| 4–2
| Soa Palelei
| TKO (punches)
| Shooto Australia: NHB
| 
| align=center| 2
| align=center| 4:33
| Melbourne, Australia
| 
|-
| Win
| align=center| 4–1
| Vince Lucero
| TKO (punches)
| CFM: Octogono Extremo
| 
| align=center| 1
| align=center| N/A
| Monterrey, Mexico
| 
|-
| Loss
| align=center| 3–1
| Kensuke Sasaki
| Submission (guillotine choke)
| X-1
| 
| align=center| 1
| align=center| 2:35
| Yokohama, Japan
| 
|-
| Win
| align=center| 3–0
| Jay White
| TKO (punches)
| WEC 4
| 
| align=center| 3
| align=center| 3:42
| Uncasville, Connecticut, United States
| 
|-
| Win
| align=center| 2–0
| Sam Sotello
| Submission (rear-naked choke)
| KOTC 16: Double Cross
| 
| align=center| 1
| align=center| 4:20
| San Jacinto, California, United States
| 
|-
| Win
| align=center| 1–0
| Dennis Taddio
| TKO (punches)
| Shogun 1
| 
| align=center| 1
| align=center| 1:23
| Honolulu, Hawaii, United States
|

References

External links
 
 
 Christian Wellisch - UFC Fans

1975 births
American male mixed martial artists
Hungarian male mixed martial artists
Living people
McGeorge School of Law alumni
Sportspeople from Budapest
Sportspeople from Sacramento, California
United States Army officers
Ultimate Fighting Championship male fighters
Hungarian emigrants to the United States